Guadalupe Victoria  is a city and seat of Guadalupe Victoria Municipality, in the state of Durango, north-western Mexico. In 2010, the city of Guadalupe Victoria had a population of 16,506.

Climate

References

Populated places in Durango